Luc Daffarn (born 31 January 1998) is a South African rower. He competed in the 2020 Summer Olympics.

References

1998 births
Living people
Sportspeople from Pretoria
Rowers from Johannesburg
Rowers at the 2020 Summer Olympics
South African male rowers
Olympic rowers of South Africa
21st-century South African people